The 1981–82 season was the 36th season in FK Partizan's existence. This article shows player statistics and matches that the club played during the 1981–82 season.

Players

Squad information

Friendlies

Competitions

Yugoslav First League

Yugoslav Cup

Statistics

Goalscorers 
This includes all competitive matches.

Score overview

See also
 List of FK Partizan seasons

References

External links
 Official website
 Partizanopedia 1981-82  (in Serbian)

FK Partizan seasons
Partizan